Sell Control for Life's Speed is the second album by Canadian rock band Pilot Speed (at the time known as Pilate). It was recorded at The Armoury, Vancouver BC (tracks 1, 2, 5-11) and at Phase One Studios, Toronto ON (tracks 3, 4).

In the United States, the album was released on September 19, 2006, with the album title changed from Sell Control for Life's Speed to Into the West. The albums also feature slightly different track listings. "Lover Come In", which was track 8 on the original album, is replaced by two tracks, "Into Your Hideout" and "Alright", which are tracks 8 and 9 on the U.S. version although those songs were on their debut album Caught by the Window. Both tracks are presented on alternate mixes.

"Barely Listening" was featured in the videogame NHL 07.

Track listing
All songs by Pilate, all words by Todd Clark.

U.S. version  "Into The West"

2006 albums
Pilot Speed albums
MapleMusic Recordings albums